James Wasson may refer to:
 James R. Wasson, U.S. Army officer who worked in Japan
 James C. Wasson, member of the Mississippi House of Representatives